Saybrook Manor is a community  and census-designated place (CDP) in Old Saybrook, a town in Middlesex County, Connecticut, United States. The population was 1,127 at the 2020 census. The Saybrook Manor section is generally the area south of U.S. Route 1 between the Westbrook town line and the Oyster River.

Geography
Saybrook Manor is in southeastern Middlesex County, in the southwest part of the town of Old Saybrook. It is bordered to the south by Long Island Sound.

Demographics
As of the census of 2000, there were 1,133 people, 522 households, and 328 families residing in the CDP. The racial makeup of the CDP was 96.12% White, 0.35% African American, 2.74% Asian, 0.26% from other races, and 0.53% from two or more races. Hispanic or Latino of any race were 0.79% of the population.

There were 522 households, out of which 18.4% had children under the age of 18 living with them, 52.3% were married couples living together, 6.5% had a female householder with no husband present, and 37.0% were non-families. 30.3% of all households were made up of individuals, and 14.0% had someone living alone who was 65 years of age or older.  The average household size was 2.17 and the average family size was 2.69.

In the CDP, the population was spread out, with 17.5% under the age of 18, 3.7% from 18 to 24, 27.1% from 25 to 44, 28.9% from 45 to 64, and 22.8% who were 65 years of age or older.  The median age was 46 years. For every 100 females, there were 97.4 males.  For every 100 females age 18 and over, there were 98.1 males.

The median income for a household in the CDP was $54,489, and the median income for a family was $73. Males had a median income of $40,221 versus $37,938 for females. The per capita income for the CDP was $30,511.  About 3.7% of families and 7.4% of the population were below the poverty line, including 15.7% of those under age 18 and none of those age 65 or over.

References

Old Saybrook, Connecticut
Census-designated places in Middlesex County, Connecticut
Neighborhoods in Connecticut
Census-designated places in Connecticut